Hypocoena rufostrigata is a species of moth of the family Noctuidae first described by Alpheus Spring Packard in 1867. It is found along the Atlantic coast of North America north to the Northwest Territories and Alaska, south in the west to California and Utah.

The wingspan is 26–30 mm. Adults are on wing from June to September. There is one generation per year, although there may be a partial second brood.

References

External links

Apameini
Moths of North America
Taxa named by Alpheus Spring Packard
Moths described in 1867